Apple Park is the corporate headquarters of Apple Inc., located in Cupertino, California, United States. It was opened to employees in April 2017, while construction was still underway, and superseded the original headquarters at 1 Infinite Loop, which opened in 1993.

The main building's scale and circular groundscraper design, by Norman Foster, have earned the structure the media nickname "the spaceship". Apple co-founder Steve Jobs wanted the campus to look less like a business park and more like a nature refuge; 80 percent of the site consists of green space planted with drought-resistant trees and plants indigenous to the Cupertino area, and the center courtyard of the main building features an artificial pond.

History 
In April 2006, Apple's then CEO Steve Jobs announced to the city council of Cupertino that Apple had acquired nine contiguous properties to build a second campus, the Apple Campus 2. The idea for a new headquarters was conceived by Jobs and Apple's then chief designer Jony Ive. Ive was Apple's immediate choice to design the project, going on to work very closely together with Norman Foster across five years, designing every detail, from the glass panels to the elevator buttons.

Purchases of the needed properties were made through the company Hines Interests, which in at least some cases did not disclose the fact that Apple was the ultimate buyer; Philip Mahoney, a partner with a local commercial real estate brokerage, noted that this is common practice in attempts to arrange the purchase of contiguous land made up of multiple parcels with separate owners, in order to keep costs from skyrocketing and not reveal the company's plans to competitors. Among the sellers of the properties were SummerHill Homes (a plot of ) and Hewlett-Packard (three buildings of their campus in Cupertino).

Until April 2008, Apple had not sought the necessary permits to begin construction, so it was estimated that the project would not be ready in 2010 as originally proposed; however, the buildings on the site were held by Apple for its operations. In November 2010 the San Jose Mercury News revealed that Apple had bought an additional  no longer used by HP Inc., just north across Pruneridge Ave. This space had been the HP campus in Cupertino before it was relocated to Palo Alto.

On June 7, 2011, Jobs presented to the Cupertino City Council details of the architectural design of the new buildings and their surroundings. He did not live to see construction begin. Jobs died a few months later, on October 5, 2011.

On October 15, 2013, Cupertino City Council unanimously approved Apple's plans for the new campus after a six-hour debate. Shortly thereafter, demolition work began to prepare the site for construction.

On February 22, 2017, Apple announced the official name of the campus as the "Apple Park", and the auditorium to be named the "Steve Jobs Theater".

Originally expected to break ground in 2013 and open in 2015, the project was delayed and started in 2014. The campus opened for workers in April 2017, despite continued construction work. This was followed by the first event in the Steve Jobs Theater, which took place on September 12, 2017. The Apple Park Visitor Center opened five days later, on September 17, 2017.

As a consequence of the presence of the Apple Park in the area, surrounding streets have met with both increased tourism, along with rising real estate values of local housing, often drawing in Apple employees wanting to live near the workplace.

Location 

Apple has had a presence in Cupertino since 1977, which is why the company decided to build in the area rather than move to a cheaper, distant location. The campus is also next to a contaminated site under Superfund legislation with a groundwater plume.

Design and construction 
Steve Jobs, in June 2011, in his final public appearance before his death, was quoted as saying:

The ring-shaped building, advertised as "a perfect circle", was not originally planned as such. The inner rim and outer rim on each floor are left open as walkways. There are eight buildings, separated by nine mini-atria. The one circular building houses most employees. It is four stories above the ground and three stories underground. Apple created life-size mock-ups of all parts of the building to analyze any design issues.

The design hides the roads and parking spaces underground. The campus uses only glass for its walls and views of the inner courtyard as well as of the landscape facing the exterior of the building. Around  of space is for meetings and breakout spaces in the building. The inner part of the circular building contains a  park featuring a pond, with fruit trees and winding pathways inspired by California fruit orchards.

Steve Jobs wanted no seam, gap, or paintbrush stroke visible for a clean fit and finish.

All interior wood used for furniture was harvested from a certain species of maple, with Apple working with construction companies from 19 countries for designs and materials.

A breathing, hollow concrete slab acts as floor, ceiling, and HVAC system. A total of 4,300 such slabs were used. Some of the slabs weigh .

Construction
During construction, the building's structure was started by Skanska and DPR, but they were removed from the job for undisclosed reasons. The firms Rudolph and Sletten and Holder Construction completed the structure, envelope, and interior buildout. Truebeck Construction (then known as BNBTBuilders) worked on the exterior landscaping, Steve Jobs Theater, and the health and fitness center; McCarthy Building Companies built the parking garage; and Granite Construction performed road widening and utility work.

The facade panes are produced by Bavarian company Josef Gartner.

Costs 

The land cost was estimated at $160 million. In 2011, the budget for Apple's Campus 2 was less than $3 billion. However, in 2013 the total cost was estimated to be closer to $5 billion.

Energy source 
The campus is one of the most energy-efficient buildings in the world, and the main building, Steve Jobs Theater, and fitness center are all LEED Platinum certified. In an April 2018 press release, Apple announced that it had switched to being powered entirely by renewable energy. The solar panels installed on the roof of the campus can generate 17 megawatts of power, sufficient to power 75% during peak daytime, and making it one of the largest solar roofs of the world. The other 4 megawatts are generated onsite using Bloom Energy Server fuel cells, which are powered by biofuel or natural gas. The air flows freely between the inside and outside of the building, providing natural ventilation and obviating the need for HVAC systems during nine months of the year.

Facilities

Cafés 
The campus has seven cafés, with the largest being a three-level café for 3,000 sitting people. It has light-colored stone lining and glass railing with no metal support and is surrounded by extensive landscaping.

The sports tables and benches resemble those in Apple Stores.

Auditorium 

Officially known as the Steve Jobs Theater, after the co-founder and former CEO of Apple, the facility is located atop a hill on the campus. It is an underground, 1,000-seat auditorium intended for Apple product launches and press meets. It has a large above-ground cylinder-shaped lobby with stairs down to the auditorium. The theater has 350 parking spaces on North Tantau Avenue and a pedestrian path leading to the main campus located northwest of the theater.

The theater's lobby has cylindrical-shaped glass walls and no support columns, which give an unhindered 360-degree view of the surrounding campus. The  carbon-fiber roof, made of 44 identical panels, was supplied by the Dubai-based company, Premier Composite Technologies. It is the largest carbon-fiber roof and the largest glass-supported structure in the world.

The elevator is made from chemically tempered glass, and is considered to be the tallest free-standing glass elevator in the world.

The theater's first press event was held on September 12, 2017, where the iPhone 8, iPhone 8 Plus, iPhone X, Apple Watch Series 3 and Apple TV 4K were announced.

Wellness center 
A  fitness center is located in the northwest of the campus. Apart from gym equipment, the fitness center features other amenities like changing rooms, showers, laundry services, and rooms for group sessions.

Research and development facility 
The research and development facilities feature two large  buildings on the southern edge of the campus and are occupied by more than 2,000 people. The top floor of each building houses the department comprising industrial design and human interface teams formerly headed by design chief Jony Ive.

Transportation

Bus 
Employees traveling by bus will board and depart from the bus station, which leads to the main campus via two white staircases. The area is also served by the Santa Clara Valley Transportation Authority (VTA), which runs a local bus service from Cupertino to nearby cities. Prominent transit consultant Jarrett Walker, who worked with the VTA on providing service to the campus, criticized the campus' design due to its poor access to public transit.

Parking 
Parking is located both underground and in two large parking structures accommodating approximately 14,200 employees. Cupertino regulations required a minimum of 11,000 parking spaces, 700 of which have electric vehicle charging stations.

There are 2,000 parking spaces in the subterranean parking garage. The parking is managed by sensors and apps, which manage the traffic and parking spaces.

Cycling 
There are 1,000 bikes on the campus for employees to get around, with miles of cycling and jogging trails all over the  campus. There are an additional 2,000 bicycle parking spaces in the subterranean car parking garage.

Apple Park Visitor Center 

Apple Park Visitor Center is a two-story  structure with four main areas: an Apple Store featuring Apple-branded merchandise (T-shirts, hats, tote bags, postcards) not sold at regular Apple stores, a  café, an exhibition space which currently showcases a 3D model of Apple Park with augmented reality, and a roof terrace overlooking the campus. It opened to the public on November 17, 2017. The estimated cost of the center is $80 million. The property at 10600 N. Tantau (NE corner of Tantau and Pruneridge) is across the road from the campus proper and abuts a Santa Clara residential neighborhood. The underground parking garage, with close to 700 spaces, has an estimated cost of $26 million. The Visitor Center is the only part of Apple Park which tourists are permitted to visit.

Apple Park Developer Center 
Apple Park Developer Center is a two-story structure across the street from Apple Park Visitor Center. Construction began in May 2021. Apple Park Developer Center was inaugurated on June 6, 2022 during WWDC.

Grounds

Landscaping 

80% of the campus consists of green space. The spacious courtyard in the middle of the primary building was planted with apricot, olive, and apple orchards, as well as a herb garden near the cafe. Other plants selected for the campus landscape are drought tolerant. Recycled water is used to water the campus.

In 2011, Apple hired an arborist, Dave Muffly, to cultivate California's natural environment around Apple Park. Apple's headhunters tracked down Muffly in 2010 after Jobs recognized the quality of the oak trees near the Stanford Dish and asked staff to find the arborist who was caring for them.

There are 9,000 trees on the Apple Park campus, of 309 varieties of indigenous species. The planted trees are Oak savanna, Oak wood, and fruit trees including apple, apricot, plum, cherry, and persimmon. An additional  are used for a native California grassland. Among the apple varieties represented are Golden Delicious, Granny Smith, Gravenstein, and Pink Lady, but the McIntosh is notably absent, due to its incompatibility with the area's climate.

After he began work in earnest, Muffly realized that fewer than a hundred of the 4,000 existing trees were usable. This meant he had to procure from scratch almost all of the 9,000 planned trees. His team went so far as to search abandoned Christmas tree farms, and Apple bought one at Yermo in the Mojave Desert.

Historic barn 

The land that Apple purchased for the campus came with an old barn that was built in 1916 by John Leonard using redwood planks. Leonard married into the Glendenning Family, who immigrated to the United States from Scotland and settled in the area in the 1850s. After Apple purchased the property, there were discussions between Apple, the Cupertino Historical Society, and the city of Cupertino as to the fate of the barn. The city's interest in the barn stemmed from its 2004 declaration as a historical site.

Eventually, Apple agreed to keep the barn on the property and is using it to "store maintenance tools and other landscaping materials". The barn was disassembled during the campus construction and then reassembled in a different location from where it was originally located.

Inner courtyard 
In the center, there is a rectangular field with several arches that resemble a rainbow when seen from a distance.

Criticism 

The design of the Apple Park campus has been called the "ultimate example" of suburban office parks, which have been in decline as companies seek to relocate to urban areas with better transit, bicycle, and pedestrian access. Kaid Benfield of the Natural Resources Defense Council, a non-profit environmental advocacy group, criticized the proposed campus for contributing to existing suburban sprawl, with car-dependent features and waste of expensive real estate that could have been used for affordable housing.

The headquarters also gained unfavorable attention when it emerged in 2018 that two workers had been injured and required hospital treatment after walking into the building's clear glass walls and doors.

Apple received some criticism for the perceived extravagance of its new headquarters, as well as its perfectionist approach to its design and construction. The use of special wood as a construction material was reported to be the subject of a 30-page guideline. The design of door handles was reported to be the subject of a one-and-a-half-year debate, involving several revisions before the Apple management gave its approval. Apple's desire for custom signage put the company at odds with the Santa Clara County Fire Department, requiring several rounds of negotiations due to fears it could compromise safety in case of emergencies.

In her book Brotopia, writer Emily Chang criticized Apple Park for having no daycare facilities for employees' children, despite it ostensibly serving the needs of every individual.

References

External links 

 "One More Thing: Inside Apple's Insanely Great (Or Just Insane) New Mothership" article, Wired

Apple Inc.
2017 establishments in California
Buildings and structures in Santa Clara County, California
Corporate headquarters in Silicon Valley
Cupertino, California
Foster and Partners buildings
High-tech architecture
Information technology company headquarters in the United States
Office buildings completed in 2017
Office buildings in California
Round buildings